Mai Uemura (上村 麻衣 Uemura Mai, born September 15, 1987) is a Japanese volleyball player who plays for Shikoku Eighty 8 Queen.

Clubs
Tsushogyo High School → Denso Airybees (2006–2009) → Shikoku Eighty 8 Queen (2009-)

Honors
Team
 Japan Volleyball League/V.League/V.Premier　Runners-up (1): 2007-2008
 Kurowashiki All Japan Volleyball Championship　Champions (1): 2008

References

External links
 Denso Official Website Profile

Japanese women's volleyball players
Living people
1987 births